General Santander Stadium (Estadio General Santander) is a multi-purpose stadium in Cúcuta, Colombia.  It is currently used mostly for football matches.  The stadium has a capacity of 42,901 people. It is named in honour of Francisco de Paula Santander.

Sports venues completed in 1948
Football venues in Colombia
Multi-purpose stadiums in Colombia
Estadio General Santander